Karunagappally is a municipality in the Kollam district of Kerala, India. Karunagappally taluk consists of Alappad, Ochira, Adinad, Karunagappally, Thazhava, Pavumba, Thodiyoor, Kallalibhagom, Thevalakkara, Chavara, Neendakara, Clappana, Kulasekharapuram, Thekkumbhagam, Ayanivelikulangara, Panmana, Ponmana and Vadakumthala. The taluk is bound on the north by Kayamkulam, on the east by Kunnathur taluk, on the south by Kollam and on the west by the Arabian Sea. It is one of the fastest developing towns in Kerala and is part of Kollam metropolitan area.

Karunagappally is the location of a government engineering college named the College of Engineering Karunagappally, also known as CEK. Europeans called Karunagappally Martha.

Tourist attractions
The main tourist attraction is the house boat facility in Alumkadavu which is close (only 3 km) to Karunagappally town. Karunagappally Tourism at a glance. Sree Narayana Trophy boat race, an annual boat race is organised in the Kannety (Pallickal) River, Karunagappally, during the season of Onam Festival. Nowadays houseboat, safari boat and speed-boat services are operated from Kannetty boat club which 1 km apart from Karunagappally ksrtc bus stand to various places like Amrithapuri, Azheekkal beach, harbour, Ashtamudi lake through Vattakkayal, Kattilmekkathil temple and Chavara canal. And also to Champakkadavu where we can enjoy the beauty of villages, rare species of birds and diversity. The famous Chinese fishing nets can be found on the banks of the lagoon. The Amritapuri ashram is also situated in Parayakadavu, which is 8 km from Karunagappally. Other tourist attractions are Alumkadavu Backwater, Oachira temple, Pandarathuruth Church, Sheik Masjid Mosque, Padanayarkulangara Mahadeva Temple, Thazhava, Kovilthottam Light House, Sasthamkotta Lake, etc. Alumkadavu is the place where first houseboat made in India.

Recently, Azheekal beach is gaining popularity as a local tourist attraction.

Karunagappally was an ancient Buddhist site. There was a Buddha bhikshu named Karinagan who lived in Karunagappally. He later became known as Pallikkal Puthran (as Karunagappally is situated on the banks of Pallikkal river) hence the name Karunagappally. Many traces of ancient Buddhist culture were excavated from various places in and around Karunagappally. A statue of Karinagan was placed in front of Mahadevar temple at the heart of the city. Now it has been moved to Krishnapuram Palace, Kayamkulam.

Demographics
As of 2011 India census, Karunagappalli Municipality had a population of 25,336 where 12,219 are males and 13,117 are females. 75% of the population is Hindu; Muslims, the second-largest community having 19%. Christians are scattered and spread over Panchayths and Municipality limits, and account for 6% of the population. In the coastal panchaythat Azheekal, almost 100% of the population is Hindu. The high literacy of Kerala is reflected in Karunagappalli as well with 94.23% of the population classified as literate as against the national average of 74.04%.

Economy

Karungappalli used to be an agrarian economy until the late 19th century with coconut, banana, tapioca and paddy as the main crops grown. With rapid urbanization and the consequent pressure on land, the reliance on agriculture has dwindled. Several cottage and small industries have now come up in the area including brick making, engineering and electronics. Proximity to Kollam (27 km) and the excellent road and rail infrastructure have helped in this transition.

Fishing forms the major source of livelihood for the coast dwellers. The area also receives substantial foreign remittances from the large number of people from here working in the Gulf countries. Now Kerala's many prominent business centres had their branches here.

Environment

Karunagappalli is known for high background radiation from thorium-containing monazite sand. In some coastal panchayats, median outdoor radiation levels are more than 4 mGy/yr and, in certain locations on the coast, it is as high as 70 mGy/yr.

Transport

Road

Karunagappally is on the Kanyakumari-Kochi-Panvel National Highway 66 route. In taluk, Oachira to Neendakara is accessible through this same highway.

Main road transport is provided by State owned Kerala State Road Transport Corporation (KSRTC) and private transport bus operators. KSRTC Bus Station is situated in the heart of the town, on the National Highway 66 . Buses are available from Karunagappally to Kollam, Thiruvananthapuram, Alappuzha, Ernakulam, Thrissur, Kottayam, Kayamkulam, Shasthamkotta, Harippad, Kottarakkara, Kodungallur, Guruvayur, etc. Local services are also available to destinations throughout the district. The station operates Super Fast, Fast Passenger, Non AC low-floor, Venad and Ordinary buses.

Road transport is also supported by private taxis and autorickshaws, also called as autos.

Rail

Karunagappalli railway station ,(KPY) is a NSG 5 category railway station situated in Edakkulangara. It lies on the Kollam-Kayamkulam rail route of the Thiruvananthapuram-Ernakulam railway line and is only 1.5 km far from the KSRTC bus station. Auto rickshaws are available from and to the railway station. Buses are available to railway station bus stop every 15 minutes (150 meters from station). Also buses are available from town to Alumoodu Jn. bus stop every 5 minutes, which is only 700 meters away from KPY railway station. There are 32 express and 18 passenger trains are available from here.

Mumbai (Lokamanyathilak)-Thiruvananthapuram-Lokamanyathilak Netravati Express, Kanyakumari-Bangalore-Kanyakumari Island Express, TVC-Hydrabad-TVC Sabari Express, Kanyakumari-Mumbai-Kanyakumari Jayanthy Janatha Express, Nagarcoil-mangalur-Nagarcoil Ernad Express, TVC-Mangalur-TVC Maveli Express, TVC-Ernakulam-TVC Vanchinad Express, Nagarcoil-mangalur-Nagarcoil Parasuram Express, TVC-Shornur-TVC Venad Express, TVC-Mangalur-TVC Malabar Express, TVC-palakkad-TVC Amritha Express, Rajya Rani Express, Thiruvananthapuram-Guruvayoor-TVC Intercity Express, Kollam - Visakhapatnam Express, Trivandrum-Mangalapuram-Trivandrum Express and Punalur Palakkad Palaruvi Express are the main train connections. Around 50 trains have stop here in both directions.
Station Code: KPY.

Air

Trivandrum International Airport is the nearest airport and is easily accessible via the National Highway 66.

Politics
Karunagapalli assembly constituency is part of Alappuzha Lok Sabha constituency and the major political parties in Karunagappally municipality and nearby panchayaths were CPI[M], CPI, Congress, BJP

Including Neendakara, Thevalakkara, Chavara and Panmana Panchayaths, Chavara assembly constituency is part of Quilon Lok Sabha constituency. CPI(M), RSP, CPI, BSP, BJP,  are major political parties there.

Industries
The major industries in the public sector are Indian Rare Earths Limited (IRE) and Kerala Minerals and Metals Limited (KMML) in Shankaramangalam.KERAFED in Puthiyakavu, house-boat manufacturing in Alumkadavu, the state owned Kerala Feeds Ltd in Kallelibhagom are also major industries. The KMML is the first of its kind.

Cashew nut industry plays a vital role. Western India cashews in Puthiyakavu and Latha cashews processing, imports and exports in Charamurimuk are the major cashew processing units in town limits. Coconut, paddy, tapioca, banana, etc. are the other main agricultural crops. Prominent small scale and cottage industries are based on bricks, well rings making, engineering, electronics items and handicrafts.

Religious centers
There are many religious centers in and around Karunagappally. The Municipality is known for its religious harmony. Major religious centers include Kattilmekkathil Devi Temple,Sree Subhramanyaswami Temple  Panama,Changankulangara Sree Mahadevar Temple,Thevalakkara Major Devi Temple, Pulithitta Chathushashti Yogini Sametha Mahakali Dharmadaiva Temples (Pulithitta Sree Bhadrabhagavathy Dharmadaiva Temple),India Pentecostal Church of God,Karunagappally,Assemblies of God Church, Karunagappally,The Pentecostal Mission,Karunagappally,  Karunagappally Sheikh Masjid, Padanayarkulangara Mahadeva Temple, Ochira Parabrahma Temple, Sree Mookumpuzha Devi Temple, Maruthoorkulangara Mahadeva Temple, Mararithottam Mahadeva Temple, Puthiyakavu Devi Temple, Karunagappally Jama'at Mosque, Vallikkavu Temple, and Puliyankulangara Temple,Shree kasiviswanatha temple and Vadakke nada bhagavathi temple Cheriazheekal

References

External links
Karunagappally Taluk

Cities and towns in Kollam district